Wynyard, an electoral district of the Legislative Assembly in the Australian state of New South Wales was created in 1904 and abolished in 1913.


Election results

1910

1907

1904

References

New South Wales state electoral results by district